Lanthanum(III) bromide (LaBr3) is an inorganic halide salt of lanthanum. When pure, it is a colorless white powder. The single crystals of LaBr3 are hexagonal crystals with melting point of 783 °C. It is highly hygroscopic and water-soluble. There are several hydrates, La3Br·x H2O, of the salt also known. It is often used as a source of lanthanum in chemical synthesis and as a scintillation material in certain applications.

Lanthanum bromide scintillation detector
The scintillator material  cerium activated lanthanum bromide (LaBr3:Ce) was first produced in 2001. LaBr3:Ce-based radiation detectors offer improved energy resolution, fast emission and excellent temperature and linearity characteristics. Typical energy resolution at 662 keV is 3% as compared to sodium iodide detectors at 7%. The improved resolution is due to a photoelectron yield that is 160% greater than is achieved with sodium iodide. Another advantage of LaBr3:Ce is the nearly flat photo emission over a 70 °C temperature range (~1% change in light output).

Today LaBr3 detectors are offered with bialkali photomultiplier tubes (PMT) that can be two inches in diameter and 10 or more inches long . However, miniature packaging can be obtained by the use of a silicon drift detector (SDD) or a Silicon Photomultiplier (SiPM). These UV enhanced diodes provide excellent wavelength matching to the 380 nm emission of LaBr3. The SDD is not as sensitive to temperature and bias drift as PMT. The reported spectroscopy performance of the SDD configuration resulted in a 2.8% energy resolution at 662 keV for the detector sizes considered.

LaBr3 introduces an enhanced set of capabilities to a range of gamma spectroscopy radioisotope detection and identification systems used in the homeland security market. Isotope identification utilizes several techniques (known as algorithms) which rely on the detector's ability to discriminate peaks. The improvements in resolution allow more accurate peak discrimination in ranges where isotopes often have many overlapping peaks. This leads to better isotope classification. Screening of all types (pedestrians, cargo, conveyor belts, shipping containers, vehicles, etc.) often requires accurate isotopic identification to differentiate concerning materials from non-concerning materials (medical isotopes in patients, naturally occurring radioactive materials, etc.) Heavy R&D and deployment of instruments utilizing LaBr3 is expected in the upcoming years.

References

Lanthanum compounds
Bromides
Phosphors and scintillators
Lanthanide halides